Empress Xiaojingxian (28 June 1681 – 29 October 1731) of the Manchu Plain Yellow Banner Ula Nara clan, was the primary wife of the Yongzheng Emperor. She was empress consort of Qing from 1723 until her death in 1731, and was posthumously honoured with the title Empress Xiaojingxian. Yongzheng did not elevate any of his other consorts to the position of empress after she died.

Life

Family background
 Father: Fiyanggū (/费扬古), served as a first rank military official (/领诗卫内大臣), and held the title of a first class duke
 Paternal grandfather: Bohucha
 Mother: Lady Aisin Gioro
 Maternal grandfather: Murhu (/穆尔祜; d. 1654), Cuyen's grandson
 Maternal grandmother: Lady Borjigin
 Three elder brothers and one younger brother

Kangxi era
Lady Ula Nara was born on the 13th day of the fifth lunar month in the 20th year of the reign of the Kangxi Emperor, which translates to 28 June 1681 in the Gregorian calendar. 

In 1691, she married Yinzhen, the fourth son of the Kangxi Emperor, and became his primary consort. On 17 April 1697, she gave birth to their first son, Honghui, who would die prematurely on 7 July 1704.

Yongzheng era
The Kangxi Emperor died on 20 December 1722 and was succeeded by Yinzhen, who was enthroned as the Yongzheng Emperor. On 28 March 1723, Lady Ula Nara, as the Yongzheng Emperor's primary consort, was instated as empress and put in charge of the emperor's harem.

She died on 29 October 1731 and was interred in the Tai Mausoleum of the Western Qing Tombs.

Titles
 During the reign of the Kangxi Emperor (r. 1661–1722):
 Lady Ula Nara (烏拉那拉氏; from 28 June 1681)
 Primary Consort (from 1691)
 During the reign of the Yongzheng Emperor (r. 1722–1735):
 Empress (from 28 March 1723)
 Empress Xiaojing (from December 1731 or January 1732)
 During the reign of the Qianlong Emperor (r. 1735–1796):
 Empress Xiaojingxian (from 1737)

Issue
 As primary consort:
 Honghui (/弘晖; 17 April 1697 – 7 July 1704), the Yongzheng Emperor's first son

In fiction and popular culture
 Portrayed by Zhuang Li in Yongzheng Dynasty (1999)
 Portrayed by Amber Xu in Palace (2011)
 Portrayed by Mu Tingting in Scarlet Heart (2011)
 Portrayed by Ada Choi in Empresses in the Palace (2011)
 Portrayed by Sun Feifei in Palace II (2012)
 Portrayed by Annie Yi in The Palace (2013)
 Portrayed by Joan Chen in Ruyi's Royal Love in the Palace (2018)

See also
 Imperial Chinese harem system#Qing
 Royal and noble ranks of the Qing dynasty

Notes

References
 

1681 births
1731 deaths
Qing dynasty empresses
Manchu nobility
17th-century Chinese women
17th-century Chinese people
18th-century Chinese women
18th-century Chinese people
Consorts of the Yongzheng Emperor
Ulanara clan